The Trio 3 is a live album by pianist Cedar Walton, bassist David Williams and drummer Billy Higgins recorded in 1986 and released on the Italian Red label.

Reception

AllMusic awarded the album 4 stars stating "It's a rare pleasure to hear Walton playing bop, pure and simple. The trio swings remarkably well here. Walton's touch is rich and dynamic, his voicings slightly spicy, his solo concise."

Track listing 
All compositions by Cedar Walton except as indicated
 "Girl Talk" (Neal Hefti) – 6:00
 "Fantasy in D" – 9:47
 "Ground Work" – 5:45
 "Once I Loved" (Antônio Carlos Jobim) – 5:35
 "Another Star" (Stevie Wonder) – 8:30
 "Theme for Red" – 5:47
 "Relaxin' at Camarillo" (Charlie Parker) – 8:35 Bonus track on CD

Personnel 
Cedar Walton – piano
David Williams – bass
Billy Higgins – drums

References 

Cedar Walton live albums
1986 live albums
Red Records live albums